Ilyinets is an impact crater in Ukraine (Vinnytsia Oblast).

It is 8.5 km in diameter and the age is estimated to be 378 ± 5 million years (Upper Devonian). The crater is not exposed at the surface.

References

External links
"Star wound" at Vinnitsia Region Portal

Impact craters of Ukraine
Devonian impact craters
Geography of Vinnytsia Oblast